The Precision 15, also called the Precision 15 K (for keel), is an American trailerable sailboat, that was designed by Jim Taylor and first built in 1995.

A sailing dinghy version with a centerboard and no ballast was also built and designated the Precision 15 CB.

Production
The design was built by Precision Boat Works in Palmetto, Florida, United States from 1995 to 2018. More than 800 examples of both models were produced.

Design

The Precision 15 is a recreational keelboat, built predominantly of fiberglass, with a vinyl ester resin skin coat. It has a fractional sloop rig with anodized aluminum spars and a hinged mast step. The hull has a raked stem, a plumb transom, a transom-hung, kick-up rudder controlled by a wooden tiller, with a tiller extension and a fixed keel. The boat has foam flotation, a boom vang and jib tracks.

The design displaces  and carries  of ballast.

The manufacturer lists the boat's design goals as "safety, stability, reliable handling, and sprightly speed under sail".

An optional mount may be fitted for a small outboard motor for docking and maneuvering.

Operational history
In a 2003 review of the Precision 15 K by naval architect Robert Perry, he wrote, "the target market for this boat could be family day-sailing, but the 15 would also make a very nice trainer. The hull is broad enough to provide stability without acrobatics. At 600 pounds the boat is also light enough to be fast and responsive. The broad and flattish sections aft mean that the 15 will be stable off the wind in a breeze. In light air you can move crew weight forward and get the tail out of the water to reduce wetted surface. The keel is a bulb-end plate-type with a draft of only 1 foot, 8 inches. The rudder is considerably deeper than the keel. I'd like to see a deeper keel, but I realize that Taylor and Precision have become very adept at doing these minimal-draft appendages."

See also
List of sailing boat types

References

External links

Keelboats
1990s sailboat type designs
Two-person sailboats
Sailboat types built in the United States
Sailboat type designs by Jim Taylor Yacht Designs
Sailboat types built by Precision Boat Works